Mount Clarke is a mountain,  high, located  due east of Mount Iveagh in the Queen Maud Mountains. It rises along the east margin of the Snakeskin Glacier, near the edge of the interior ice plateau. It was discovered and named by the Southern Journey Party of the British Antarctic Expedition, 1907–09, under Ernest Shackleton.

References
 

Mountains of the Ross Dependency
Dufek Coast